Morilloa is a genus of flowering plants belonging to the family Apocynaceae.

Its native range is Eastern Brazil.

Species:

Morilloa carassensis 
Morilloa furlanii 
Morilloa lutea 
Morilloa piranii

References

Apocynaceae
Apocynaceae genera